Eudaemonia troglophylla is a species of moth in the  family Saturniidae. It is found in Angola, the Democratic Republic of Congo, Equatorial Guinea, the Central African Republic, Nigeria, and Gabon.

Subspecies
Eudaemonia trogophylla trogophylla
Eudaemonia trogophylla hartfordi (Rougeot, 1962)

References

Moths described in 1919
troglophylla